Chairman of the Joint Chiefs of Staff may refer to the most senior military officer in several countries:

 Chairman of the Joint Chiefs of Staff (United States)
Chairman of the Joint Chiefs of Staff (Jordan)
Chairman of the Joint Chiefs of Staff (South Korea)
Chairman Joint Chiefs of Staff Committee (Pakistan)

See also
Chiefs of Staff (disambiguation)
Joint Chiefs of Staff (disambiguation)